Mathieu de Montmorency (1767–1826) was a French nobleman and statesman during the French Revolution and the Bourbon Restoration.

It may also refer to:
Matthew I of Montmorency (died 1160)
Matthew II of Montmorency (died 1230)
Matthew III of Montmorency (died 1270)
Matthew IV of Montmorency (died 1305)

See also
House of Montmorency